A wire editor (also known as telegraph editor) selects and edits news stories. Editing includes checking for spelling and punctuation, relevance of information, selection of content and space allocated to stories, and rewriting.

References

Sources

Further reading 
 
Iron editor p. 18 

 
Technical communication
Writing occupations
Journalism occupations
Types of editors